Hale is a ghost town in Carbon County, Utah. The reservoir covers the upper part of town. Like the other nearby towns of Scofield and Winter Quarters, Utah, Hale was a coal mining camp.

References

Ghost towns in Carbon County, Utah
Mining communities in Utah
Ghost towns in Utah